Șotrile is a commune in Prahova County, Muntenia, Romania. It is composed of six villages: Lunca Mare, Plaiu Câmpinei, Plaiu Cornului, Seciuri, Șotrile and Vistieru.

References

Communes in Prahova County
Localities in Muntenia